Wooler is a small town in Northumberland, England. It lies on the edge of the Northumberland National Park, near the Cheviot Hills. It is a popular base for walkers and is referred to as the "Gateway to the Cheviots". As well as many shops and pubs, the town has a youth hostel, many hotels, and campsites. It lies on the St. Cuthbert's Way long-distance footpath between Melrose Abbey and Lindisfarne.

The main A697 links the town with Morpeth and Coldstream on the Scottish Border. Wooler has two schools; Wooler First School (including Little Acorns Nursery) and Glendale Community Middle School. The schools and nursery share a single campus on Brewery Road (from September 2015) providing education for children in the Glendale area from 2 years old to 13 years old.

Close by to the west is Yeavering Bell, crowned by a large Iron Age fort, a stronghold of the Votadini. The remnants of many stone huts can be seen on its summit, which is surrounded by a collapsed stone wall.

History
Wooler was not recorded in the Domesday Book, because when the book was written in 1086, northern Northumbria was not under Norman control. However, by 1107, at the time of the creation of the 1st Baron of Wooler, the settlement was described as "situated in an ill-cultivated country under the influence of vast mountains, from whence it is subject to impetuous rains". Wooler subsequently enjoyed a period of prosperity and with its expansion it was granted a licence in 1199 to hold a market every Thursday.  The St. Mary Magdalene Hospital was established around 1288.

Wooler is close to Humbleton Hill, the site of a severe Scottish defeat at the hands of Harry Hotspur in 1402. This battle is referred to at the beginning of William Shakespeare's play Henry IV, Part 1 – of which Hotspur is the dashing hero.

After the Dissolution of the Monasteries, the patronage and tithe income from the parish church passed from the Bishop of Durham to the Earl of Tankerville.

Wooler also used to have a drill hall that was the local "picture house" which children were evacuated to in World War II. There also used to be a fountain situated at the top of Church Street in the town.

Alexander Dalziel of Wooler (1781–1832) was the father of the celebrated Dalziel Brothers. Seven of his eight children were artists, and became celebrated wood-engravers in London. Their sister Margaret was also a wood-engraver.

Between 1887 and 1965 the town was served by Wooler railway station on the Alnwick to Cornhill Branch.

Places of worship
Wooler has several places of worship including:
 St Mary's Parish Church (Church of England, 1765), Church Street, a Grade II listed building. (There has been a building on the site for over 700 years.)
 Wooler United Reformed Church (1784), Cheviot Street, a Grade II listed building. (Before the union that formed the United Reformed Church in 1972, this was Wooler Presbyterian Church.)
 St Ninian's Catholic Church (1856), Burnhouse Road, a Grade II listed building.
 Wooler Evangelical Church (Fellowship of Independent Evangelical Churches, 2003), Cheviot Street.
At one time, there was also a Methodist congregation in Wooler.  The old Methodist chapel on Cheviot Street is now the Glendale Hall.

Meaning of place-name
Wooler may be from Old English wella "well, spring" and ofer (ridge, hill). A record of the name as Welnfver in 1186 seems to suggest this origin. The well or spring referred to is the River Till. The Wooler Water, part of which is also known as Happy Valley, is a tributary of the River Till and is formed by a confluence of the Harthope and Carey Burns which rise in the Cheviot Hills, to the south of Wooler.

Another possible origin is "Wulfa's hillside", from the Old English personal name Wulfa "wolf" and őra "hillside, slope", although this word in place-names usually means "river mouth, shore". A record of the name as Wulloir in 1232 may suggest this origin.
It is not certain which is the actual origin.

Governance
An electoral ward in the same name exists. This ward stretches from the Scottish Border south-east to Ingram with a total population taken at the 2011 Census of 4,266.

Freedom of the Parish
The following people and military units have received the Freedom of the Parish of Wooler.

Individuals
 Anthony Murray : 27 May 2021.

 Rev Cuthbert Allen of Wooler  1730-1779   http://cullenproject.ac.uk/case/1/

References

External links

Community website

Northumberland Communities

 
Towns in Northumberland
Civil parishes in Northumberland